Krishnashtami is a 2016 Indian Telugu film written and directed by Vasu Varma, cinematography by Chota K. Naidu, and produced by Dil Raju under Sri Venkateswara Creations. It features Sunil, Nikki Galrani and Dimple Chopade in the lead roles.

The film was released worldwide on 19 February 2016.

Cast
 Sunil as Krishna Vara Prasad
 Nikki Galrani as Pallavi
 Dimple Chopade as Priya
 Mukesh Rishi as Raghupati
 Ashutosh Rana
 Saptagiri
 Pavitra Lokesh
 Brahmanandam
 Tulasi
 Posani Krishna Murali
Sivannarayana Naripeddi

Audio
The audio songs of this movie, along with a trailer was released in the "Maitri" annual festivities conducted at the Godavari Institute of Engineering and Technology.

Reception 
A critic from Deccan Chronicle wrote that "Krishnashtami has a reasonable plot, but is let down by lazy execution and insipid performances".

Box office

Domestic
Krishnashtami grossed  ₹3.5 crore on the opening day at AP/Telangana box office making second best opener for Sunil after Maryada Ramanna. The film grossed ₹6 crore in its opening weekend.

Overseas
Krishnashtami collected $29,382 at the US box office in its first weekend.

References

External links

2016 films
2010s Telugu-language films
Indian action comedy films
2016 action comedy films
Sri Venkateswara Creations films